The Musole forest tree frog (Leptopelis brevipes) is a species of frog in the family Arthroleptidae endemic to Equatorial Guinea.
Its natural habitat is subtropical or tropical moist lowland forest.

References

Leptopelis
Endemic fauna of Equatorial Guinea
Amphibians described in 1906
Taxonomy articles created by Polbot